Adam Arreak Lightstone is a Canadian politician, who was elected to the Legislative Assembly of Nunavut in the 2017 general election. He represents the electoral district of Iqaluit-Manirajak.

Originally from Rankin Inlet, Lightstone spent his youth between Iqaluit and Kingston, Ontario.

Prior to entering politics, he worked in several roles in the Department of Finance of the government of Nunavut, most recently as a senior fiscal advisor with the expenditure management division, where he worked to prepare the government's budgets, monitor forecasts, and provide recommendations on financial matters to the Financial Management Board. After graduating from Inuksuk High School he continued his education and received an advanced accounting diploma from St. Lawrence College and a bachelor's degree in business administration from Laurentian University.

He is the nephew of Eva Aariak, the territory's second premier.

References

Members of the Legislative Assembly of Nunavut
Inuit politicians
Living people
People from Iqaluit
Year of birth missing (living people)
21st-century Canadian politicians
Inuit from the Northwest Territories
Inuit from Nunavut
People from Rankin Inlet